Joseph Harley may refer to:

 Joseph Emile Harley (1880–1942), Governor of South Carolina, 1941–1942
 Joseph Auty Harley (born 1843) (1843–1906), mayor of Nelson, New Zealand, 1899–1901
 Joseph Auty Harley (born 1895) (1895–1973), mayor of Nelson, New Zealand, 1947–1956